Pterostichus strenuus is a species of woodland ground beetle in the family Carabidae. It is found in North America, Europe, and temperate Asia.

References

Further reading

 

Pterostichus
Articles created by Qbugbot
Beetles described in 1796